The Soft Skin is a 1964 French-Portuguese romantic drama film directed by François Truffaut and starring Jean Desailly, Françoise Dorléac, and Nelly Benedetti. Written by Truffaut and Jean-Louis Richard, the film is about a successful married publisher and lecturer who meets a beautiful air hostess with whom he has a love affair. The film was shot on location in Paris, Reims, and Lisbon, and several scenes were filmed at Paris-Orly Airport. At the 1964 Cannes Film Festival, the film was nominated for the Palme d'Or. Despite Truffaut's recent success with Jules and Jim and The 400 Blows, The Soft Skin did not do well at the box office.

Plot
Pierre Lachenay (Jean Desailly), a well-known writer and editor of a literary magazine, is running late for his flight to Lisbon. His friend gives him a ride to the airport, with his daughter Sabine going along for the ride, and they arrive just in time. On the airplane he makes eye contact with a beautiful air hostess named Nicole (Françoise Dorléac). Upon landing, he is greeted by photographers who ask that he pose with the air hostess.

Pierre checks in at the Hotel Tivoli, and then leaves to attend a conference. As he's walking through the lobby he notices Nicole walking past him. At the conference he gives a talk titled "Balzac and Money" based on one of his books. Back at the hotel, he sees Nicole in the lift and notices her room number. In his room he calls her room and asks if she'd like a drink, but she declines because of the late hour. Shortly after hanging up, Nicole calls back, apologizes, and accepts his invitation for drinks the next day at the hotel bar.

The next evening, Pierre and Nicole spend hours talking through the night. She is captivated by his stories of Balzac and the world of literature. In the early hours they return to the hotel and make love in her room. On the aeroplane the next day, Nicole slips him a matchbook with her phone number. Back in Paris, while he and his wife Franca (Nelly Benedetti) entertain friends, Pierre sneaks off and tries calling Nicole, but there is no one home. The next day he tries again from a phone booth, and this time he gets through, and they meet briefly. In the coming days, they spend time together between her flights. One day they meet at the airport and decide to spend the evening at a nightclub, ending up at her apartment where they make love.

Later that week, Pierre and Nicole travel to Reims where Pierre is scheduled to present a showing of the 1952 documentary film about André Gide at a conference. They check into the Hotel Michelet before Pierre heads over to the theatre. After Pierre takes to the stage, Nicole arrives without a ticket and is forced to wait in the lobby during his speech. Afterwards, Pierre's friend insists on having a drink before Pierre returns to Paris. As they leave, Pierre ignores Nicole who has been waiting in the street. When his friend invites himself to accompany him back to Paris, Pierre sneaks back to the hotel where an upset Nicole tells him he should leave without her. He apologises and they decide to leave. After driving through the night they find a romantic cabin.

The next day, Pierre and Nicole enjoy their time together taking photographs. Their happiness is cut short, however, when Pierre calls his wife to tell her he had to stay in Reims overnight. Having called Reims the previous night, Franca suspects he's lying and hangs up in anger. After driving Nicole home, Pierre faces his wife and they argue. Franca accuses him of having an affair and Pierre walks out of their apartment, spending the night sleeping in his office.

The following morning, Franca calls him at the office informing him that she will never forgive him for walking out on her and that he'll be contacted by her divorce lawyer. Pierre goes to Nicole's apartment, but she is unable to talk because her father is about to visit. Pierre passes her father on the stairwell as he's leaving. Back at his apartment, Pierre and Franca discuss their divorce and Franca falls apart, sometimes hitting him and at other times begging for his forgiveness. They make love, and afterwards she asks if he will be coming back. He tells her it would never work out with all that's happened. She slams the door behind him.

Overcome with depression, Franca is comforted by her friend Odile, who throws away the sleeping pills she finds in the bathroom fearing her friend may attempt suicide. Later that week, Pierre and Nicole have dinner and argue after Pierre gets annoyed and embarrassed by her talking loudly; the stress of divorce after fifteen years of marriage is having an effect on him. Later, as he shows her their future apartment under construction, Nicole expresses regret at having become involved with him and breaks off their relationship.

Meanwhile, Franca is given a photo shop receipt from one of Pierre's jackets by a dry cleaner and goes to pick up the photographs - the ones Pierre and Nicole took on their weekend away together. After seeing the photos, Franca goes home, gets a shotgun from her closet, drives to Le Val d'Isère Bar which Pierre frequents, walks up to his corner table, tosses the photos at him, and then shoots him dead.

Cast

 Jean Desailly as Pierre Lachenay
 Françoise Dorléac as Nicole
 Nelly Benedetti as Franca Lachenay
 Daniel Ceccaldi as Clément
 Laurence Badie as Ingrid
 Sabine Haudepin as Sabine Lachenay
 Philippe Dumat as Movie theater manager in Reims
 Dominique Lacarrière as Lachenay's assistant Dominique
 Paule Emanuele as Odile
 Jean Lanier as Michel
 Maurice Garrel as Bontemps, the bookseller
 Pierre Risch as Chanoine

 François Truffaut as Gas station attendant (voice)
 Carnero as Lisbon organizer (uncredited)
 Georges de Givray as Nicole's father (uncredited)
 Catherine-Isabelle Duport as Young girl (uncredited)
 Maximiliènne Harlaut as Mme. Leloix (uncredited)
 Charles Lavialle as Night watchman at Hôtel Michelet (uncredited)
 Gérard Poirot as Franck, the co-pilot (uncredited)
 Olivia Poli as Mme. Bontemps (uncredited)
 Thérèse Renouard as Cashier (uncredited)
 Jean-Louis Richard as Man in street (uncredited)
 Brigitte Zhendre-Laforest as Linen delivery woman (uncredited)

Production

Filming locations
 Lisbon, Portugal 
 Paris-Orly Airport, Orly, Val-de-Marne, France 
 Paris, France 
 Reims, Marne, France

Reception
The film did not perform well in the box office but received generally positive reviews upon its release. The stature of the film has continued to grow over the years. On the review aggregator web site Rotten Tomatoes, the film holds a 91% positive rating among critics based on 22 reviews.

J. Hoberman of The Village Voice wrote a glowing review, stating "François Truffaut's fourth feature, The Soft Skin, has never gotten much respect -- even though many people (myself included) regard it as one of his best." Roger Ebert gave it 3 out of 4 stars, calling it "uncannily prophetic". Stanley Kauffmann of The New Republic wrote "Francois Truffaut's latest film is a failure. His triangle story is disappointingly trite in every regard and the conclusion, alas, is laughingly melodramatic."

The film was selected into the Criterion Collection, which describes it as a "complex, insightful, and underseen French New Wave treasure".

Awards and nominations

References

External links
 
 
 
 
The Soft Skin: Love and Betrayal on the Lecture Circuit an essay by Molly Haskell at the Criterion Collection

1964 films
French black-and-white films
1960s French-language films
Films scored by Georges Delerue
Films directed by François Truffaut
Adultery in films
Films with screenplays by François Truffaut